Princess Praves Vorasamai or Phra Chao Boromwongse Ther Phra Ong Chao Praves Vorasamai (RTGS: Prawet Worasamai) (2 December 1879 – 31 May 1944), was a Princess of Siam (later Thailand. She was a member of Siamese Royal Family. She is a daughter of Chulalongkorn, King Rama V of Siam.

Her mother was Tabtim Rojanadis, daughter of Phraya Abbhantrikamas and Bang Rojanadis, elder sister of Chao Chom Manda Sae. She had a full elder brother and a younger brother;

 Prince Chirapravati Voradej, the Prince of Nakhon Chaisi (7 November 1876 – 4 February 1913)
 Prince Vudhijaya Chalermlabha, the Prince Singhavikrom Kriangkrai (5 December 1883 – 18 October 1947)

Princess Praves Vorasamai died on 31 May 1944, at the age of 64.

Ancestry

1879 births
1944 deaths
19th-century Thai women
19th-century Chakri dynasty
20th-century Thai women
20th-century Chakri dynasty
Thai female Phra Ong Chao
Dames Grand Commander of the Order of Chula Chom Klao
Children of Chulalongkorn
Daughters of kings